National Security and Nuclear Diplomacy is the memoir of Hassan Rouhani, the former President of Iran and the first secretary of Iran's Supreme National Security Council. Rouhani led Iran's nuclear case under President Mohammad Khatami as tensions began to escalate over Iran's nuclear program. Approximately two years after the book was published in 2011, Rouhani was elected as President of Iran on 15 June 2013. The book focuses on Iran's nuclear program and challenges to it by Western countries, especially the United States and three European countries of France, Germany and the United Kingdom. The book covers a period of 678 days (from October 6, 2003, to August 15, 2005) when Rouhani and his team were handling Iran's nuclear case. Furthermore, the history of Iran's nuclear technology and the process of achieving complete nuclear fuel cycle are major topics of the book.

National Security and Nuclear Diplomacy is the first book written by a leader of Iran's nuclear negotiating team. Other memoirs have been also published on Iran's nuclear case including by Mohamed ElBaradei (former Director-General of IAEA), Joschka Fischer (former German foreign minister), Jack Straw (former British foreign secretary), and Hossein Mousavian (a former member of Iran's nuclear negotiating team).

Chapters 
This book includes 12 chapters and seven appendices:
 Islamic Revolution and Nuclear Technology (1979-2003)
 Challenges and Structures
 Nuclear Tension and New Requisites (August 2002 – October 2003)
 Addressing threats to National Security (October 2003 – January 2004)
 New Crisis and Enhanced Efforts 
 Diplomacy in Crisis (August 2004 – December 2004)
 Paris Agreement
 Beginning of Negotiations and a Chance to Create Opportunity
 New Hopes
 Distrust and Doubt
 Changing Red Lines
 Achievements of 678 Days of Endeavor
 Appendix
 Chronology of Iran’s nuclear case
 Farewell
 Documents: Agreements, negotiations and letters
 Resolutions
 IAEA Director-General reports
 Press conferences
 Speeches

Contents 
National Security and Nuclear Diplomacy consists of 12 chapters and 7 appendices on 1,209 pages and is the first comprehensive book so far published on Iran's nuclear energy program, and is considered an oral history book.

The first chapter, titled Islamic Revolution and Nuclear Technology (1979-2003), includes seven sections. It focuses on the outset of nuclear technology following the Islamic Revolution and explains Iran's need to nuclear energy and the necessity of producing nuclear fuel and enriching uranium. The author has discussed the extension of Non-Proliferation Treaty (NPT) in 1995, signing of the Comprehensive Nuclear Test Ban Treaty (CTBT), and their relations to the issue of developing nuclear technology. 
High Council for Modern Technologies and the council's decision to start building an enrichment facility in Natanz in 2000 have been also explained in this chapter.

The second chapter, titled Challenges and Structures, includes 18 sections which introduce the structure of decision-making in Iran, especially the role of the Supreme National Security Council, the process of making important national decisions by this institution, especially about the situation in Iraq and Afghanistan, and its role in the nuclear case as well as its relations with other concerned institutions and authorities.

Chapter three is about the Evolution of Nuclear Tension and New Requisites (August 2002-October 2003). It includes six sections in which the author expounds how Iran's nuclear case ended in the labyrinth of problems of the IAEA and European countries, while explaining the atmosphere surrounding Iran's nuclear case before, he was appointed in charge of the nuclear team.

Chapter four, Eliminating National Security Threats (October 2003 – November 2003), consists of 15 sections which tell the memories of the author as he started off as head of the nuclear team within the Supreme National Security Council. The author has noted that this phase of his work was focused on calming the situation down, eliminating threats and establishing contacts with other involved parties, including the IAEA, ElBaradei, and the three European countries.

The most important part of this chapter is a detailed account of Saadabad negotiations and declaration (in Tehran) as well as the political environments in and out of Iran.

In the fifth chapter, New Crisis and Enhanced Efforts, which contains seven sections, the author explains how the crisis resulting from Atomic Energy Organization of Iran's first incomplete report to the IAEA, especially its omission to refer to the blueprints of the second-generation (P2) centrifuges was managed. It also deals with problems caused for Iran by Libya's submission to the demands of the US and the UK. It also delineates how this crisis was changed into an opportunity through conclusion of Brussels agreement. The author also explains domestic and international grounds which helped Iran to reduce the impact of March and June 2004 resolutions of the IAEA Board of Governors by signing Brussels agreement which raised the possibility of removing Iran's case from the IAEA's agenda. He also gives an account of why Iran's case was not normalized.

In the sixth chapter, Diplomacy in Crisis (August 2004 – December 2004), the author focuses on the marathon of exchanging plans between Iran and Europe. He also explains the breathtaking confrontation between Iran and the United States over the normalization of Iran's nuclear case, on the one hand, and preventing the case from being reported to the United Nations Security Council, on the other hand. This chapter also gives an account of domestic differences in Iran, impatience shown for the beginning of uranium enrichment, and the role of active diplomacy which provided political and international grounds for Paris agreement.

The seventh chapter, titled Paris Agreement, contains nine sections which concentrate on domestic and international conditions and explain how Iran's case was removed from the Quarterly agenda of the IAEA Board of Governors following the Paris agreement and was not reported to the Security Council. The author expounds the impact of Paris agreement on political and economic conditions in the country and necessary decisions which were taken to handle possible failure of the negotiations.

Chapter eight, Beginning of Negotiations and a Chance to Create Opportunity, has seven sections in which the author elaborates on negotiations with presidents of Russia and France, and the German chancellor, the performance of three working groups which were established following Paris agreement, and provision of “objective guarantees” about the peaceful nature of Iran's nuclear energy program. On the other hand, the author explains Iran's conditions for leaving negotiations and shows how the start of election campaigns in Iran was regarded as an important challenge to the nuclear case.

In the ninth chapter, New Hopes, which has six sections, the author analyzes foot-dragging by Europeans during expert-level negotiations and also explains Iran's initiative for offering a four-stage plan for industrial-level enrichment in early days of the Iranian calendar year, 1384 (starting March 21, 2005). In this chapter, the author also gives an account of US pressures, Europe's submissiveness before the US, and also domestic developments in Iran as a result of the presidential election, which collectively increased the pace of change in Iran's strategy. The political grounds for Iran's decision to resume work at Uranium Conversion Facility (UCF) in Isfahan, negotiations of the Steering Committee in London (in late April 2005), and announcement of the inauguration of UCF on April 30, 2005, have been also explained.

In chapter ten, which is titled Distrust and Doubt and has 10 sections, the focus is on international consequences of Iran's decision to launch the Uranium Conversion Facility (UCF), including a letter written by three European foreign ministers; contacts with Thabo Mbeki (then South African president), Kofi Annan (then Secretary-General of the UN) and Chinese and Russian officials and their recommendations to Iran to postpone the inauguration of the UCF; receiving the final European plan; the trip to Geneva; and the last negotiations with three European foreign ministers. It also explains the plan prepared by Iran to work with like-minded countries instead of pursuing agreement with the European states, after the final efforts by the Steering Committee in London failed.

In chapter eleven, Changing Red Lines, the author reflects on the efforts made by the nuclear negotiating team under his lead and also explains a three-faceted strategy. This chapter also contains an account of the resumption of operation at Uranium Conversion Facility (UCF) in Isfahan, introduction of the new nuclear team, and comparison between the situation at the beginning and the end of the period of Hassan Rouhani's nuclear team.

In chapter twelve, Achievements of 678 Days of Endeavor, the author offers a recap of all preceding chapters, and, in three sections, he deals with nuclear goals, strategies and achievements of Iran during the time he led the nuclear team.

There are seven appendices at the end of the book that include chronology of Iran's nuclear case, documents (agreements, negotiations and letters), text of resolutions, text of reports prepared by the IAEA Director-General, as well as the text of a number of press conferences and speeches by Hassan Rouhani and other high-ranking Iranian officials.

Reception 

National Security and Nuclear Diplomacy was presented in bookstores without any unveiling ceremony and simply after limited introduction on a few websites. Therefore, most media and critics did not know about it for a time. However, after an interview with Hassan Rouhani by Mehrnameh magazine in May 2012, the book hit the headlines not only in domestic print media, but also in their counterparts outside the country, including the BBC Persian TV, and many critiques were written about it.

Most critiques can be divided into two main categories. The first group lauded the book for its comprehensiveness and the groundbreaking views and analysis. The second group complained about revelation of secret documents as well as the book's coverage of the concerns among Iranian officials and domestic issues. They noted that such information might be exploited by the negotiating parties opposing Iran and concluded that publication of the book has been a dis-service to the country's interests and national security. They also stated that the book is one-sided and the author has omitted some facts which were not in line with his or his team's interests.
 
In a preface to the first edition of the book, the author wrote that he had done his best to provide an honest account of what happened during his tenure. However, he added, as the nuclear case still continued, he had taken many considerations into account when writing the book.

One year after the publication of the book, none of the high-ranking Iranian officials have publicly spoken or written about the book and its contents.

Positive points 
Iran's nuclear program entails the most complicated and fateful international crisis Iran has had to face, second only to the Iran–Iraq War. Rouhani's memoir are important in that they focus on an issue which is still among the most important topics of discussion, taking into account that the consequences of the decisions made by Iranian leaders and high-ranking officials on this issue still continue and have been tied to the fate of 75 million Iranians.

On the other hand, the book's relative comprehensiveness, which has been enhanced by adding the text of negotiations and other relevant documents, has made it rank among oral history books.

The process of making decisions in Iran's political structure on fateful and historical issues, the way those decisions are rounded up, and the impact of personal views of various officials on those decisions have been elaborated in Rouhani's memoir. In addition, these memoir include readable and important details of the method and the content of negotiations between Iran's nuclear team and European sides, which make a thorough judgment about the performance of the nuclear team and decisions made by the Iranian leaders possible.

Negative points 

There is an absence of a glossary of technical terms so as to let the readers know about how the nuclear fuel cycle is achieved and how such terms as UF6, UF4, UCF, and P1 and P2 centrifuges are different. The absence of suitable and relevant photos as well as a summary part at the beginning or the end of every chapter is another weakness.

The contents of the book are apparently a combination of dictated and written parts as a result of which certain topics have been frequently, and unnecessarily, repeated throughout the text.

Print and publication 
National Security and Nuclear Diplomacy was first published by the Expediency Council's Center for Strategic Research in 999 pages in fall of 2011, but was introduced and distributed in April 2012.

The second edition of the book “with corrections” was published in 1027 pages in spring of 2012. The third edition “with additional contents” came out in summer of 2012. It included the text of negotiations with the foreign ministers of three European states in Tehran and Brussels, the text of negotiations with ElBaradei, as well as the text of news conferences and speeches by Rouhani, which increased the book's size to 1209 pages.

The fourth and fifth reprints of the book came out in fall of 2012 and winter of 2013.

Narration of Foresight and Hope 
Excerpts from National Security and Nuclear Diplomacy were published in March 2013, entitled Narration of Foresight and Hope, along with photos of nuclear negotiations in 552 pages.

In the preface of the book, the author has noted that in line with the old saying, “fewer words can make the point,” he had decided to print excerpts from the main book as an independent volume to be used by those readers who lack enough time to go through the original volume.

See also
 Nuclear program of Iran
 Timeline of the nuclear program of Iran
 Not for the Faint of Heart: Lessons in Courage, Power and Persistence
 The Pragmatic Entente: Israeli-Iranian Relations, 1948-1988

References

External links 
Hassan Rowhani, Iran's moderate conservative behind nuclear breakthrough SpaceWar - Oct 22, 2003
Iran’s Nuclear Aspirations Threaten the World JCPA - August 6, 2009
Nuclear Decision-Making in Iran: A Rare Glimpse  Brandeis University
Iran's National Security and Nuclear Diplomacy: An Insider's Take LobeLog
Former chief nuclear negotiator - Hassan Rouhani - exposes new details on Iran’s nuclear policy

2011 non-fiction books
Iranian books
Political memoirs
Oral history books
Nuclear program of Iran
Nuclear energy in Iran
Foreign relations of Iran
Politics of Iran
Hassan Rouhani
Books about politics of Iran
Hassan Rouhani's policies and views